Rodrigo Lopez may refer to:

 Roderigo Lopes (c. 1517–1594), Portuguese physician to Queen Elizabeth I of England, who is said to have inspired Shakespeare's Shylock
 Rodrigo López (baseball) (born 1975), Major League Baseball starting pitcher
 Rodrigo López (footballer, born 1978)), Uruguayan football forward and football manager
 Rodrigo López (soccer, born 1987), American soccer midfielder
 Rodrigo López (footballer, born 2001), Mexican football midfielder
 Rodrigo López (footballer, born 2002), Paraguayan football midfielder

See also
 López